The National Penitentiary and Prison Institute, INPEC, is the Colombian central government agency responsible for the incarceration and rehabilitation of convicted criminal offenders, and administration of the penitentiary institutions in the country

References

Government agencies established in 1992
Ministry of Justice and Law (Colombia)
Prisons in Colombia
Colombia